The 1978 Colgate International was a women's tennis tournament played on outdoor grass courts at Devonshire Park in Eastbourne in the United Kingdom. The event was part of the AA category of the 1978 Colgate Series. It was the fourth edition of the tournament and was held from 19 June through 24 June 1978. Second-seeded Martina Navratilova survived a match point in the 2h12m final against first-seeded Chris Evert to win the singles title and earn $14,000 first-prize money.

Finals

Singles
 Martina Navratilova defeated  Chris Evert 6–4, 4–6, 9–7
It was Navratilova's 8th singles title of the year and the 22nd of her career.

Doubles
 Chris Evert /  Betty Stöve defeated  Billie Jean King /  Martina Navratilova 6–4, 6–7, 7–5

Prize money

See also
 Evert–Navratilova rivalry

Notes

References

External links
 Women's Tennis Association (WTA) tournament details

Colgate International
Eastbourne International
Colgate International
June 1978 sports events in the United Kingdom
1978 in English women's sport